The Charter of the Organization of the American States (otherwise known the Charter of the OAS) is a Pan-American treaty that sets out the creation of the Organization of American States. It was signed at the Ninth International Conference of American States of 30 April 1948, held in Bogotá, Colombia. The treaty came into effect on 13 December 1951.

Amendments
It has been amended by the:
Protocol of Buenos Aires (27 February 1967)
Protocol of Cartagena (5 December 1985)
Protocol of Washington (14 December 1992)
Protocol of Managua (10 June 1993)

Signatories
The American countries that are signatories of the OAS Charter are, ordered by accession date: 

Argentina (1948)
Bolivia (1948)
Brazil (1948)
Chile (1948)
Colombia (1948)
Costa Rica (1948)
Cuba (1948) – By resolution of the Eighth Meeting of Consultation of the Ministers of Foreign Affairs (1962) Cuba was excluded from participating in the OAS, but this resolution ceased to have effect in 2009 by the OAS resolution AG/RES. 2438 (XXXIX-O/09).
Ecuador (1948)
El Salvador (1948)
United States of America (1948)
Guatemala (1948)
Haiti (1948)
Honduras (1948) Suspended after the 2009 coup that ousted President Manuel Zelaya. Readmitted in May 2011.
Mexico (1948)
Nicaragua (1948)
Panama (1948)
Paraguay (1948)
Peru (1948)
Dominican Republic (1948)
Uruguay (1948)
Venezuela (1948)
Antigua and Barbuda (1967)
Barbados (1967)
Trinidad and Tobago (1967)
Jamaica (1969)
Grenada (1975)
Suriname (1977)
Dominica (1979)
Saint Lucia (1979)
Saint Vincent and the Grenadines (1981)
Bahamas (1982)
Saint Kitts and Nevis (1984)
Canada (1990)
Belize (1991)
Guyana (1991)

External links
 Copy of the OAS Charter
Signatories and Ratifications

Organization of American States

Treaties concluded in 1948
Treaties entered into force in 1951
Organization of American States
Treaties of Argentina
Treaties of Bolivia
Treaties of the Second Brazilian Republic
Treaties of Chile
Treaties of Colombia
Treaties of Costa Rica
Treaties of Cuba
Treaties of Ecuador
Treaties of El Salvador
Treaties of the United States
Treaties of Guatemala
Treaties of Haiti
Treaties of Honduras
Treaties of Mexico
Treaties of Nicaragua
Treaties of Panama
Treaties of Paraguay
Treaties of Peru
Treaties of the Dominican Republic
Treaties of Uruguay
Treaties of Venezuela
Treaties of Antigua and Barbuda
Treaties of Barbados
Treaties of Trinidad and Tobago
Treaties of Jamaica
Treaties of Grenada
Treaties of Suriname
Treaties of Dominica
Treaties of Saint Lucia
Treaties of Saint Vincent and the Grenadines
Treaties of the Bahamas
Treaties of Saint Kitts and Nevis
Treaties of Canada
Treaties of Belize
Treaties of Guyana
1948 in Colombia
April 1948 events in South America